Macarisia is a genus of flowering plants belonging to the family Rhizophoraceae.

Its native range is Madagascar.

Species:

Macarisia capuronii 
Macarisia ellipticifolia 
Macarisia emarginata 
Macarisia humbertiana 
Macarisia lanceolata 
Macarisia nossibeensis 
Macarisia pyramidata

References

Rhizophoraceae
Malpighiales genera